The 1988 Harvard Crimson football team was an American football team that represented Harvard University during the 1988 NCAA Division I-AA football season. The Crimson tied for next-to-last in the Ivy League.

In their 18th year under head coach Joe Restic, the Crimson compiled a 2–8 record and were outscored 272 to 202. Donald C. Peterson was the team captain.

Harvard's 2–5 conference record tied for sixth in the Ivy League standings. The Crimson were outscored 168 to 131 by Ivy opponents. 

Harvard played its home games at Harvard Stadium in the Allston neighborhood of Boston, Massachusetts.

Schedule

References

Harvard
Harvard Crimson football seasons
Harvard Crimson football
Harvard Crimson football